John Walter Boldiston (26 April 1921 – 7 January 2015) was an Australian rules footballer who played with North Melbourne in the Victorian Football League (VFL).

Notes

External links 

2015 deaths
1921 births
Australian rules footballers from Victoria (Australia)
North Melbourne Football Club players